Hari Rhodes (April 10, 1932 – January 15, 1992) was an American author and actor whose career spanned three decades beginning around 1960.

He was sometimes billed as Harry Rhodes, and appeared in 66 films and television programs, such as ABC's 1963 TV medical drama series about psychiatry Breaking Point.

Early life
In a 1968 TV Guide interview, Rhodes described growing up in a rough section of his native Cincinnati: "We lived between the railroad tracks and the river bank. The flood ran us out every winter, but we'd always come back, kick out the mud and settle down again until flood time. All the boys had to learn how to hop freights and throw pieces of coal off. All I ever knew was rats, roaches, and poverty."

When he was 15, Rhodes spent two months learning to copy his mother's signature, and forged it on enlistment papers to join the U.S. Marine Corps.

In the Marines, Rhodes was a member of his camp's judo team for two years. He eventually gained the rank of sergeant and served in Korea, where he led a reconnaissance platoon behind enemy lines.

"The time I got wounded at the Chosin Reservoir, a Chinese came running toward me," Rhodes told TV Guide. "My Thompson submachine gun was unloaded. I threw it down so he wouldn't shoot. His face almost smiled. He had his bayonet on my chest. He began slashing my arms. I got him with an 8-inch knife."

In 1965, he published a novel based on his experiences in the Marine Corps at the last black Marine Corps Recruit Depot at Montford Point called A Chosen Few.

Acting career
In 1960, Rhodes appeared in five television series: General Electric Theater, hosted by Ronald Reagan; The Detectives Starring Robert Taylor, Have Gun, Will Travel, starring Richard Boone, The Westerner, starring Brian Keith; and in two episodes of Adventures in Paradise, starring Gardner McKay. In 1961, he was cast in an episode of ABC's Hawaii-based drama, Follow the Sun. In 1963, he played a patrolman in "Death of a Cop" on CBS's The Alfred Hitchcock Hour.

From 1966–69, Rhodes was a regular on Daktari as Mike Makula. In 1969, he starred in the short-lived series The Bold Ones: The Protectors.  His most notable television role came in 1977 in the ABC miniseries, Roots, in which he was cast as a leader of Kunta Kinte's village.  He had a pioneering role as an African-American in science-fiction television.  His portrayal of one Lt. Ernie Travers, member of a lunar exploration team in the "Moonstone" episode of The Outer Limits (1964), antedated Nichelle Nichols' portrayal of a black member (Lt. Uhura) of a space exploration crew on Star Trek. In 1985, he appeared as character Mr. Wanda in Magnum P.I.  in the episode titled "Old Acquaintance".

His early film roles included appearances in The Nun and the Sergeant (1962), Drums of Africa (1963), Shock Corridor (1963), The Satan Bug (1965), and Mirage (1965). In 1966, he played a supporting role as Captain Davis in the successful suspense-comedy motion picture Blindfold, starring Rock Hudson and Claudia Cardinale. He also played Mr. MacDonald, who aids Caesar in Conquest of the Planet of the Apes (1972), and was the star of the blaxploitation film Detroit 9000 (1973). His later film credits included Mayday at 40,000 Feet! (1976), The Hostage Heart (1977), Coma (1978), and the Burt Reynolds cop thriller Sharky's Machine (1981).

Acting and racism's effect on his writing
Rhodes' first television role was in a 1957 episode of Dick Powell's Zane Grey Theater that starred Sammy Davis Jr. The role came just one year after Rhodes had received a rude lesson in racial prejudice.

"I read about a training program a major studio had for grooming people for 'stardom.' Being naïve about the system, I got on the phone and called the man in charge and asked if he would interview me, and he told me to come around to the studio," Rhodes told TV Guide in 1968. "I said, 'By the way, I think I should tell you that I am a Negro.' He said, 'Don't waste your time – we don't take Negroes in this program.' I hung up the phone. Almost tore the cradle off the thing."

Rhodes channeled his anger into a novel, A Chosen Few, which was published in a paperback edition. A Chosen Few was described as "an explosive personal portrait of what (Rhodes) saw and lived through in the heart of the American South in the last all-Negro Marine boot camp." The novel's uneducated hero remarks, "Bitterness ... is a consuming, cancerous quality out of which comes nothing but self-destruction, while out of an anger can come many constructive things, if nothing more than the drive to get something done."

Rhodes later penned two unpublished novels: Harambee, about a man with a plan to liquidate the world's entire Caucasian population, and Land of Odds, about Hollywood.

Rhodes told TV Guide that writing served as his safety valve. "I'd rather be writing my own than reading somebody else's. I have no need for it." Rhodes said.

Filmography

Death
Hari Rhodes died of a heart attack in January 1992, a few months before the premiere of his final project, the made-for-TV feature Murder Without Motive: The Edmund Perry Story.

Bibliography
A Chosen Few. Bantam Books, 1965.
The Hollow and the Human. Vantage, 1976

See also

References

Further reading
 Hobson, Dick. (1968, April 20–26). "On Maneuvers With Hari Rhodes". TV Guide, p. 18–19.

External links
 
 

1932 births
1992 deaths
20th-century American male actors
African-American male actors
American male film actors
20th-century American male writers
United States Marine Corps personnel of the Korean War
American male television actors
Male actors from Cincinnati
20th-century African-American writers
United States Marine Corps non-commissioned officers
African-American male writers